Syzygium antisepticum, or shore eugenia, is native to Maritime Southeast Asia.

Distribution
The plant is endemic to the islands of Sumatra,  Java, and Borneo of the Greater Sunda Islands archipelago.

It is found in dry evergreen forests, especially those in coastal areas.

Description
Syzygium antisepticum  is a medium-size tree. It has a distinctive red trunk with flaky bark. Leaves are glossy dark green on the upper side and paler on the lower side. Young leaves are reddish.

The flowers are compact in the inflorescence. Fruits are small, white and berry-like.

References

antisepticum
Flora of Borneo
Flora of Java
Flora of Sumatra
Trees of Malesia
Herbs